The Battle of the Ruhr (5 March – 31 July 1943) was a strategic bombing campaign against the Ruhr Area in Nazi Germany carried out by RAF Bomber Command during the Second World War. The Ruhr was the main centre of German heavy industry with coke plants, steelworks, armaments factories and ten synthetic oil plants. The British attacked 26 targets identified in the Combined Bomber Offensive. Targets included the Krupp armament works (Essen), the Nordstern synthetic oil plant at Gelsenkirchen and the Rheinmetal–Borsig plant in Düsseldorf, which was evacuated during the battle. The battle included cities such as Cologne not in the Ruhr proper but which were in the larger Rhine-Ruhr region and considered part of the Ruhr industrial complex. Some targets were not sites of heavy industry but part of the production and movement of materiel.

The Ruhr had been attacked by Bomber Command from 1940; its defences and the amounts of industrial pollutants produced a semi-permanent smog that hampered bomb aiming. Along with anti-aircraft guns, searchlights and night fighters, the Germans built large night-time decoys such as the Krupp decoy site near Essen to spoof the bombers into hitting the open country. Cities outside the Ruhr were attacked to prevent the Germans from concentrating their defences and before the end of the battle, Operation Gomorrah on 24 July 1943 began the Battle of Hamburg. After the turn to Hamburg, Bomber Command continued to raid the Ruhr to keep the German defences dispersed.

Background

Bomber Command, 1942

In 1942 some answers to the chronic problems of night navigation and target finding began to emerge but the number of bombers had stagnated. In November 1941 Bomber Command had a daily average of 506 bombers available and in January 1943 the average was 515. To carry out the Thousand-bomber raids Bomber Command drew on crews and aircraft from the Operational Training Units, which could only be exceptional. Navigation had been helped by the introduction of Gee but this device lacked accuracy for bombing through the dark and smog of the Ruhr, lacked range and from 4 August 1942 the Germans began to jam the device.

The Pathfinder Force (PFF) was established on 15 August 1942 but with Gee jammed and no target indicator bombs to mark the aiming point for the rest of the bombers (the Main Force), the task of the PFF varied from thankless to impossible. Despite its problems, Bomber Command had been able to achieve some spectacular results but these had been isolated events and due to favourable circumstances as well as judgement. The loss of 1,404 aircraft and 2,724 damaged to German night defences of increasing quantity and quality, especially German night fighters had become a serious threat to the viability of the command and of strategic bombing as a theory of war.

In 1942 Bomber Command had created 19 new squadrons but 13 had been transferred to other commands. The quantity of aircraft had barely increased but a big improvement in quality had been achieved. Bristol Blenheim light bombers and Armstrong Whitworth Whitley medium bombers had been retired from the command in mid-1942, followed by the Handley Page Hampden medium bomber in September. The disappointments of the Short Stirling and the early Handley Page Halifax variants and the fiasco of the Avro Manchester, withdrawn in June 1942, was balanced by the Avro Lancaster, which made its operational début in March and demonstrated its superiority over all other bombers. Re-equipment with new types of aircraft led to an average of 16.36 per cent of Bomber Command squadrons withdrawn from operations for conversion onto new aircraft in 1942, against 3.3 per cent in 1943. On 1 January 1942 the command had 48 squadrons, 9 with heavy bombers, 34 with medium and five with light bombers (Blenheims). On 1 January 1943, there were 49 squadrons, 32 heavy, 11 medium and six light (de Havilland Mosquito). The command had flown 30,508 operational sorties in 1941 and dropped  of bombs, in 1942 it dropped  from 29,929 sorties.

Gee

Gee worked well as a homing device but early hopes of it being accurate enough for blind bombing were not realised. Crews appreciated the value of the apparatus for navigation on the return journey, removing the fear of flying into hills and other obstructions. By August 1942, 80 per cent of the bomber force was equipped and 100 per cent by January 1943. Coverage of the Ruhr was known as the eastern chain and later northern and southern chains were added. Gee was usually ineffective east of the Ruhr and was easy to jam, which began on 4 August 1942, from when Gee fixes were only obtainable over the North Sea and parts of France. Gees loss of accuracy with distance made it a better target-finding device for  raiders over Britain. The signals were encoded to prevent German use but this made it harder for Bomber Command navigators to get Gee fixes. Anti-jamming devices were short-lived in effectiveness as the Germans quickly overcame them but Gee Mk II was easier for navigators to use.

Oboe

Oboe was a blind-bombing device controlled by two ground stations in England which measured the distance of an aircraft from them with radar pulses. Cat tracked the aircraft over the target and Mouse calculated the point on the track where the aircraft should bomb. Oboe transmissions did not follow the curvature of the earth, making the altitude of the aircraft the determinant of range. Use of the Mosquito made an Oboe run safer, even when no evasive action could be taken before bombing. Accuracy was measured in hundreds of yards which increased with greater experience of the aircrews and ground operators.

Oboe could be jammed and suffer interference from Monica and other Bomber Command devices. Oboe Mk I operated on a frequency of 1.5 metres, K Oboe was in general use from mid-June 1943 and was free from jamming. Centimetric Oboe Mk II and Mk III retained the effectiveness of Oboe until the end of the war but are beyond the scope of this article; rushing Oboe Mk I into service delayed Mk II but jamming did not begin until August 1943. Cat and Mouse stations could handle only one aircraft at a time and a marking run took ten minutes, allowing six bomb- or marker-runs per hour. The illumination from a Target Indicator bomb usually lasted for six minutes, guaranteeing four-minute gaps in marking. A failed marking run increased the gap to fourteen minutes. The introduction of multi-channel control and more ground stations eventually increased the concentration of Oboe marking. From the introduction of Oboe in December 1942 until the end of the war, Oboe aircraft made 9,624 sorties on 1,797 raids.

1943

At the beginning of 1943, the political resolve of the British government to support the bomber offensive remained and more resources had been provided. A plan to create a 4,000-strong bomber force had been abandoned as unrealisable but the diversion of Bomber Command squadrons to RAF Coastal Command and overseas commands was constrained and its expansion continued. A blind bombing device, Oboe, had been introduced on the night of 20/21 December 1942, H2S, a ground-scanning radar, on 30/31 January and a new target indicator bomb had come into service on 16/17 January. The new devices and the increase in the number of heavy bombers promised a large improvement in the quantity of bombs dropped and in accuracy of aim.

For the first time since day bombing was abandoned in 1940, Bomber Command was released from the constraints occasioned by the adoption of night bombing. The tactical use of the new devices was developed quickly but the new equipment had limitations. Oboe had a range which was little beyond the Ruhr and research on repeater aircraft to extend its range was stopped because H2S was expected to be a better system and only a few aircraft could use the device simultaneously; although Oboe had the potential for a vast improvement in target finding, it was not of pinpoint accuracy. H2S could be installed on any aircraft but was complicated, difficult to use and emitted radiation which could be detected, paradoxically exposing the aircraft to interception. Gee remained useful as a means of navigation on return journeys but required development to overcome German jamming.

Target Indicator bomb

The Target Indicator bomb (TI) was an aerodynamic metal case which ejected coloured pyrotechnic candles at a set height by a barometric fuze. If set to ignite immediately they made a cascade. When sky marking, the candles were on parachutes and if fuzed for ground burst, they created a pool of coloured fire. The TI was introduced on the night of 16/17 January 1943 and was a great success, making pathfinding a practical operation of war.

H2S

H2S was a device for navigation and blind bombing by radar. The emissions of the radar were reflected and received as echoes which were distinctive of the earth below. Built-up areas returned echoes different from fields and forests, land echoes could be distinguished from the sea and sea echoes from those of a ship. The radar had a scanner which swept vertically and the echoes were detected by a receiver and displayed on a cathode-ray tube, with a sweep rotating at the same speed as the scanner, giving an impression of the earth below. The contrast between water and land made coasts, lakes and rivers particularly recognisable. Towns also stood out and sometimes railway lines, from which the navigator could determine his position. When closer to the target, if it was recognisable, an H2S bombing run could be made; if the target could not be distinguished the bomber could make a timed run from a landmark in the vicinity. Since the device was airborne its range was limited only to that of its aircraft. The apparatus was limited by echoes from towns and cities which were harder to distinguish than those from countryside and town.

H2S was inferior to Oboe for blind bombing except on coastal targets like Hamburg. Being a transmitter, H2S disclosed itself to the Germans as soon as enough parts had been recovered from shot-down bombers to analyse its characteristics. German detectors could find a bomber stream and direct night-fighters into it. Once Bomber Command began to use centimetric H2S in January 1943 it was inevitable that the Germans would retrieve one from a crashed bomber and realise that it was similar to Air-to-Surface Vessel radar (ASV) used by Coastal Command to detect surfaced submarines. In October 1943, beyond the scope of this article, the Germans introduced the Naxos radar detector in night-fighters and U-boats. By mid-January 1943, only 10 Halifax bombers and 13 Stirlings carried H2S; the rate of production was slow and by May 1943, no more than 18 H2S-equipped bombers had participated in one raid; by August 840 H2S sets had been manufactured.

Prelude

German air defences

The threat of Anglo-American strategic bombing had been a concern to German strategists since 1940 at the latest. After the Fall of France, a belt of Freya radar stations was built to give early warning of aircraft entering German-controlled airspace, from Denmark south to Switzerland. Freya lacked the accuracy needed for ground-controlled interception of aircraft and was supplemented later in 1940 by Würzburg radar stations which were accurate enough to guide FlaK and night fighters, a -guided FlaK battery shooting down a bomber in September 1940. In October  (Colonel) Josef Kammhuber established three night-fighter zones on the approaches to the Ruhr.

A night-fighter could be guided to within  of an aircraft and then attack when the aircraft was illuminated by the searchlights, a procedure called  ( [Illuminated night fighting]). The system lacked effectiveness on cloudy nights, the range of the  radar [] was too short and it could not Identify friend or foe, which led occasionally to attacks on friendly night fighters; some night fighter crews disliked ground control for the loss of flexibility. The German system had not been centralised to sift the information provided by radar, searchlights, wireless interception and direction finding to co-ordinate FlaK and night-fighters. To the end of 1940, the new system was credited with the shooting down of 42 bombers by night fighters and 30 by FlaK.

Three  guided the searchlights to illuminate bombers as they entered the zone.  were extended in circumference and the chain was extended along the coasts of France and the Low Countries and around Berlin. Late in 1941 an improved  with a -range and the Seeburg plotting table came into service. Kammhuber intended to introduce  behind the Kammhuber Line, placed  stations on either side and installed master searchlights. The system was introduced in September but proved to be too complex and the number of interceptions decreased.

A new  (combined) method was intended to counter the new and faster four-engined bombers coming into service with Bomber Command but the risk of the FlaK shooting down night-fighters was too great and the system was a failure. In 1941, Bomber Command losses rose to 3.6 per cent from the 2.9 per cent of 1940. During a raid on Berlin on the night of 7/8 November, 12.4 per cent of the 169 bombers were shot down. The night-fighter force shot down 433 bombers and by the end of the year, nine  and one  were in action. The confused and overlapping jurisdictions of the German defence against night attacks were exacerbated by the lack of effectiveness of the British night bomber offensive and this complacency was not shaken by the entry of the United States into the war in December.

Because of the diversion of night-fighters to the Eastern front and the Mediterranean, by February 1942, there were 265 night-fighters in the west, of an establishment of 367, only half of which were operational. The British resorted to a deliberate campaign of area bombing which immediately increased the amount of destruction achieved by Bomber Command. The bomb tonnage increased from 37,000 in 1941 to 50,000 in 1942. The German night defence was not prepared for the change in British methods and the introduction of GEE, the first night navigation aid. The British ended the individual timing of bomber sorties in favour of the concentration of all the bombers in space and time, which made most of the Kammhuber Line redundant, leaving only a few fighters able to attack the bombers. In 1942, Bomber Command had been able to inflict considerable damage on several occasions but had failed consistently to disrupt the German war economy.

During 1942, the night-fighter command organisation  abolished its  for three  on 1 May and by February 1943, 477 night-fighters were available from an establishment of 653, of which 330 were operational, double that of 1942, 90 per cent of which were in the west. Despite the weight of the apparatus and aerodynamic penalty of its aerial array causing a loss of at least  in speed, night-fighter interceptions increased to the extent that searchlight illumination was made redundant and the lights were transferred to the local FlaK units around cities. By June the Kammhuber Line had been extended southwards towards Paris and northwards to the north coast of Denmark. In each sector, one  tracked the bomber and another the night-fighter until it was close enough for the crew to use its  AI for the attack. A zone was limited to one night-fighter but they overlapped by 50 per cent, enabling three night-fighters to operate in one area. GEE was jammed from August, limiting its usefulness to no further than the European coast. Much of the airspace of Europe remained undefended and bomber streams made all but a few night-fighters ineffective, which limited the capacity of German night defences to shoot down no more than about 6 per cent of Bomber Command sorties.

Night-fighters and FlaK were shooting down an average of 5.6 per cent of Bomber Command aircraft per raid by the autumn. The performance of FlaK also showed an improvement, from July to August 1942, Bomber Command reported the loss of 696 bombers, 269 thought to have been destroyed by night-fighters, 193 by FlaK and 334 loses to unknown causes; 1,394 aircraft were damaged, 153 were hit by night-fighters and 941 by FlaK. By the end of the year, the  had faced 77,500 night sorties, shooting down 2,859 bombers, a rate of 3.6 per cent and damaged far more. In 1940 Bomber Command lost a bomber crashed in Britain for every 32 sorties and in 1942 the rate had increased to one in twenty. According to post-war research by the Allies, bombing cut German production by 0.7 to 2.5 per cent in 1942, compared to the devotion of 33 per cent of the British war economy to the bomber offensive.

Despite the big increase in the German anti-aircraft effort, such concern for the future as existed did not prevent 150 FlaK batteries from being transferred to Italy. The advent of British four-engined bombers had increased by 70 per cent the bomb tonnage carried by Bomber Command. Milch predicted that the Anglo-American air fleets would swamp the German air defences and destroy the war economy. Milch told Goering that his target of 360 new fighters per month would be insufficient even if it were increased to 3,600, which Jeschonnek dismissed by saying that he would not know what to do with 360 new fighters a month. During the spring of 1943, the Germans increased the ground anti-aircraft defences in the Ruhr; by July there were more than 1,000 large FlaK (anti-aircraft) guns (88 mm guns or larger) and 1,500 lighter guns (most being 20 mm and 37 mm) about a third of the anti-aircraft guns in Germany, which needed 600,000 men, women and boys to operate.

Ruhr

Most of the valleys had been built over by fourteen towns creating a conurbation covering , with a population of about 4,115,000. The region was the most industrial in Germany, with 71 per cent of the output of coking coal and 61.5 per cent of its pig iron and steel and 67 per cent of the special steels essential in the rest of the German economy. From 1940, many foreign workers, prisoners of war and slave labourers were brought to the Krupp works at Essen, already a city of 670,000 people.

The main Krupp works in the Essen town centre covered , a subsidiary on the edge of town another  and from 1940 became important targets of the British strategic bombing strategy. The mining industries of the region employed another 16 per cent of the population. The most important towns were Essen, Cologne and Duisburg, site of the largest inland port in Europe. The decoy was successful before the advent of British night navigation and blind bombing devices late in 1942 and early 1943. Before 1943, Krupps had been hit by 48 bombs and 1,515 incendiaries and the decoy site by 70 bombs and 5,665 incendiaries.

Battle

Operation Chastise, 16/17 May 1943

Operation Chastise was a special operation carried out during the battle to disrupt the Ruhr by attacking its sources of water and hydroelectric power. 617 Squadron was formed in secret and trained at short notice to attack the dams above the Ruhr with special bombs. Nineteen Lancasters in three waves were dispatched. Six bombers did not reach the dams (one turning back after losing its bomb and five were shot down). Twelve Lancasters bombed, five against the Möhne Dam, three the Eder Dam, two the Sorpe Dam and one the Schwelme Dam. The Möhne and Eder were breached. The Mohne Reservoir was an important supplier of water to the Ruhr and the flooding caused much damage to road, rail and canals, leading to electricity and water shortages, rationing being necessary until the autumn rains. The Eder Dam was larger but was  distant from the Ruhr and the breach had more effect on Kassel and its vicinity. The Sorpe Dam was only slightly damaged and was able to keep the Ruhr operating during the repairs to the Möhne. Three more aircraft were lost on the return flight, 53 aircrew were killed and three taken prisoner. There were 1,294 civilian casualties, 859 occurring at Neheim-Hüsten where 493 female Ukrainian slave labourers were drowned; another 58 bodies were found around the Eder Dam.

Other targets

Bomber Command raided cities outside the Ruhr during the battle to prevent the Germans from concentrating their defences. On the night of 1/2 March Berlin was attacked by 302 bombers and on the night of 3/4 March Hamburg was raided by 417 bombers. Nuremberg was bombed on the night of 8/9 March by 335 bombers. On the night of 9/10 March Munich was raided by 264 bombers and 314 bombers hit Stuttgart on the night of 11/12 March. Berlin was visited on the night of 27/28 March by 396 bombers and again on 29/30 March by 329 bombers. Kiel was bombed by 577 aircraft on the night of 4/5 April and Frankfurt am Main was bombed by 502 aircraft on the night of 10/11 April. Bomber Command attacked Stuttgart with 562 bombers on the night of 14/15 April. On the night of 16/17 April Bomber Command conducted a raid on Pilsen, on 20/21 April Stettin (now Szczecin) was bombed by 304 aircraft and on the night of 13/14 May, Pilsen was bombed again. In June, raids outside the Ruhr consisted of a 72-aircraft attack on Münster during the night of 11/12 June followed by 60 bombers against Friedrichshafen on the night of 20/21 June. Aachen was bombed by 374 aircraft on the night of 13/14 July.

Aftermath

Analysis
In 1956 the New Zealand official historian, Henry Thompson, wrote that at Essen, after more than 3,000 sorties and the loss of 138 aircraft, the "Krupp works...and the town...itself contained large areas of devastation" and Krupp did not resume locomotive production after the second March raid. The battle demonstrated the increasing power of Bomber Command. Targets that hitherto been invulnerable were severely damaged and this appeared to be feasible on targets inside Oboe range. Earlier successes had depended on the weather and occasional opportunities that could not be replicated. Harris saw the Battle of the Ruhr as a beginning and that more cities in Germany would have to be devastated and that the Ruhr would have to be attacked again to keep repaired factories out of production.

Bomber Command dropped  of bombs in area attacks and killed about 181,000 civilians. In one raid, in fifteen minutes, 90 per cent of Wuppertal-Barmen was destroyed and 2,450 people killed. On 10 April, after visiting Essen to see for himself, Josef Goebbels, the Propaganda Minister, wrote in his diary,

Goebbels blamed Göring and Ernst Udet, the chief of procurement, for negligence on a grand scale. On 8 May, Hitler told Milch that either  tactics or technology was lacking and after meeting Hitler on the same day, Goebbels wrote,

By June the night-fighter force had been increased to 18 , five more than at the start of the year but the  system limited the number of night-fighters over the Ruhr to 36. FlaK that had been diverted to Italy and the Eastern Front was recalled and new batteries of two or three FlaK batteries assembled at important targets to counter the shorter time that the bombers were over the target. The Ruhr FlaK was doubled to 400 batteries of heavy FlaK, with more 105 mm and 128 mm anti-aircraft guns, comprising about 40 per cent of the FlaK in Germany. In May, Kammhuber made a claim for a night-fighter force of 2,160 aircraft, especially if the US bombers turned to night bombing but Hitler refused to listen. Göring accepted Kammhuber's analysis on 6 July after more evidence of the effectiveness of RAF bombing but by then it was too late. On the night of 24/25 July the Allied bombers began the Battle of Hamburg using H2S, a new navigation aid and jammed German radars with Window ( to the Germans) against which no countermeasures had been prepared, neutralising the  system.

In the informal German official history Germany and the Second World War (1990–2018) Horst Boog wrote that by late July Harris thought that the Ruhr has been reduced to chaos, that German arms production had been substantially cut and that the morale of the population had been undermined but the Germans had already begun to disperse industry. Bomber Command had created much more destruction in Essen in 1943 with 5.6 per cent of the Bomber Command effort (3,261 sorties) and 138 losses against the 10 per cent (3,724 sorties) and 201 losses of 1942. Bomber Command overestimated its effect but achieved a reduction of four to six weeks of German industrial output. In its 43 raids on the Ruhr, Bomber Command dispatched about 18,500 bomber sorties for a loss of 872 (4.7 per cent) of the aircraft and 6,000 aircrew; another 2,126 aircraft were damaged, sometimes beyond recovery. The average loss rate was 5 per cent, with losses, damaged and losses not caused by the German anti-aircraft defences (crashed in England due to weather, damaged aircraft written off and crewmembers wounded or killed in returned aircraft) was 16 per cent during the campaign. Oboe was a success and aircraft production exceeded losses, realising a net increase from 663 aircraft in March 1943 to 776 in July.

In his 2006 study of the German war economy, Adam Tooze wrote that Bomber Command severely disrupted German production during the battle. Contemporary sources show that the bombing was a watershed in the development of the German war economy, which has been severely underestimated by later accounts. The Ruhr was the most important source of coking coal and steel in Europe and the main source of components; cutting production in the Ruhr disrupted production all over Germany. The status of the Ruhr was changed from that of the home front to a war zone with an emergency staff placed to control over the regional economy. Workers were accommodated in camps, ready to be sent to factories that were still open but these were expedients. The German night defences could not stop the British from inflicting great disruption on the war economy.

Having reorganised the steel allocation system, the German planners were forced into a large cut in the ammunition production programme to compensate. After a doubling of ammunition production in 1942, output increased by only 20 per cent in 1943. "Bomber Command had stopped Speer's armaments miracle in its tracks", despite the loss of 640 bombers and most of their crews, yet Bomber Command increased in size between February and August 1943 due to the increase in output of the British aircraft industry.

Casualties
In 1961, Webster and Frankland, in their official history The Strategic Air Offensive against Germany 1939–1945 (volume II), recorded that in February 1943, Bomber Command had an average of 593 crews and aircraft available for operations and 787 in August. During the battle, Ruhr targets were raided 43 times on 39 nights. Bomber Command dispatched 18,506 sorties, in which 872 aircraft failed to return and 2,126 were damaged, with 6,000 aircrew casualties. Some aircraft were badly enough damaged to amount to the loss of the aircraft and crew. The casualty rate (of all natures) was 16 per cent of sorties, 4.7 per cent being losses over Germany. Of 203 Mosquito bomber sorties, two aircraft were lost and from 282 Oboe-Mosquito sorties, there were two losses and six damaged. In 2006, Adam Tooze wrote that the German night defences had inflicted great damage on Bomber Command, shooting down or causing to crash 640 bombers and killing nearly 4,000 aircrew.

Dams raid

Operation Chastise had a temporary effect on industrial production, through the disruption of the water supply and hydroelectric power. The Eder Valley dam did not supply the Ruhr Area. A spare pumping system had been built for the Ruhr and Organisation Todt rapidly mobilized workers from the construction of the Atlantic Wall to make repairs. Destruction of the Sorpe Dam would have caused significantly more damage but it was a stronger design and less likely to be breached and it had been made a secondary target. Of the crews on the raid, 53 were killed and three taken prisoner. There were 1,294 casualties, 859 at Neheim-Hüsten where 493 female Ukrainian slave labourers were drowned; another 58 bodies were found around the Eder Dam.

Notes

Footnotes

References

Further reading

External links
 

World War II strategic bombing
Aerial operations and battles of World War II involving Canada
Aerial operations and battles of World War II involving the United Kingdom
Conflicts in 1943
Germany in World War II

ms:Pertempuran Ruhr